Heathwood may refer to:

 Heathwood, Queensland
 Heathwood Hall Episcopal School